Pietro Maselli  (Turin, - Figino, Canton of Ticino, December 24, 1892 ) was an Italian painter, mainly of still lifes and landscapes, in oil and water color.

He was a resident of Turin, and later move to Switzerland. In 1880 at Turin exhibited: Il giorno onomastico; in 1881 at Milan, he exhibited two canvases of game (selvaggina), and another still-life. In 1884 at the Esposition of Turin del 1884, another canvases of hunted game and one titled: Un regalo.

References

1892 deaths
Painters from Turin
19th-century Italian painters
Italian male painters
Italian still life painters
Year of birth missing
19th-century Italian male artists